Samtah (also Romanized as Şāmitah or Samta; in Arabic صامطة) is a town and sub-division in Jizan Province, in southwestern Saudi Arabia.

In March 2022, the Houthis launched a ballistic missile at an electric substation in Samtah, which set it on fire.

See also 

 List of cities and towns in Saudi Arabia
 Regions of Saudi Arabia

References

Populated places in Jizan Province